Edmund Leslie (1735 - 1796)  was an Anglican priest in Ireland during the 18th century.

Benson was born in Dublin and  educated at Trinity College, Dublin. He was Prebendary of Carncastle in Lisburn Cathedral from 1781 to 1784; and Archdeacon of Down from 1782 until his death.

Notes

Alumni of Trinity College Dublin
Archdeacons of Down
18th-century Irish Anglican priests
1796 deaths
1735 births
Christian clergy from Dublin (city)